Akuma to Freud -Devil and Freud- Climax Together is a live concert DVD by Buck-Tick, released on December 22, 2004. It was filmed on September 11, 2004 at Yokohama Arena. The limited edition box set included a second DVD with multiple angles of several songs, and two CDs of the concert.

Track listing 
 "Calm and Resonance " 	
 "21st Cherry Boy"	
 "Buster"	
 "Kick (Daichi o Keru Otoko)" (Kick (大地を蹴る男); Kick (The Man Who Kicked the Earth))
 "Asylum Garden" 	
 "Madman Blues ~Minashigo no Yuutsu~" (Madman Blues ~ミナシ児ノ憂鬱~; Orphan's Depression)
 "Kimi no Vanilla" (君のヴァニラ; Your Vanilla)
 "Candy" (キャンディ)	
 "Oukoku Kingdom Come -Moon Rise-" (王国 Kingdom Come -Moon Rise-; Kingdom Kingdom Come -Moon Rise-) 	
 "Gensou no Hana" (幻想の花; Flower of Illusion)
 "Kyokutou Yori Ai wo Komete" (極東より愛を込めて; From the Far East with Love)
 "Shanikusai -Carnival-" (謝肉祭 -カーニバル-; The Carnival -Carnival-)
 "Muchi no Namida" (無知の涙;; Tear for Ignorance)
 "Rakuen (Inori Negai)" ( 楽園 (祈り 希い); Paradise (Prayer Wish) )
 "Mona Lisa"	
 "Nocturne -Rain Song-"	
 "Jupiter"	
 "Gessekai" (月世界; Lunar World)
 "Bran-New Lover"	
 "Kodou" (鼓動; Heartbeat)
 "Physical Neurose"	
 "Cosmos"

References

2004 films
Albums recorded at the Yokohama Arena